Maria Linda Larsson (born 18 February 1979) is an ice hockey player from Sweden. She won a bronze medal at the 2002 Winter Olympics.

References 

1979 births
Living people
People from Haninge Municipality
Ice hockey players at the 2002 Winter Olympics
Olympic ice hockey players of Sweden
Swedish women's ice hockey forwards
Olympic medalists in ice hockey
Olympic bronze medalists for Sweden
Medalists at the 2002 Winter Olympics
Sportspeople from Stockholm County